Heaven Born and Ever Bright is the third studio album by British rock band Cardiacs. It was produced by Tim Smith, engineered by David Murder and mixed by both. Due to Rough Trade going bankrupt soon after the album's release, it was scarce until reissued in 1995 by the Alphabet Business Concern. This reissue was remastered and given new cover art.

Lineup changes
Heaven Born and Ever Bright was the first Cardiacs album since the departure of almost half the group. Percussionist Tim Quy left Cardiacs in 1990, and did not work with them again. Saxophonist Sarah Smith and keyboardist William D. Drake also stopped touring with the band, although they contributed to later recordings and made occasional guest appearances at concerts. Christian Hayes left Cardiacs during the making of the album, although it still features many of his guitar and vocal performances as well as a song he co-wrote. Heaven Born and Ever Bright is the first Cardiacs album featuring Jon Poole, but their last with Dominic Luckman. It is unclear how much Poole is actually featured on the record.

Reaction

In 2005, when asked what his favourite Cardiacs album is by Popular I Magazine, Tim Smith said "I like them all for their own reasons. Sorry. However, I will defend one of them as it wasn’t so well received when it popped out and that one is Heaven Born And Ever Bright. I think it came out exactly how it was intended to. A lot of people seem to think it was a bit of an accident." Similarly, asked in 2001 if Sing to God was his favourite Cardiacs album, Smith said "No… I sort of like them all in one way or another….a funny thing is that the album our fans seem to dislike the most is one that I am very proud of…. the Heaven Born And Ever Bright album which we did back in 1991…it’s got a really weird sound to it…I reckon all our albums sound completely different to each other anyway…unless you hate the stuff and then I suppose they will all sound exactly the same….and shit…and there’s an awful lot of people who share that opinion."

Track listing
All songs written by Tim Smith unless otherwise indicated.

Personnel
Tim Smith – vocals, guitar
Jim Smith – bass, vocals
Jon Poole – guitar, vocals
Dominic Luckman – drums
Sarah Smith – saxophone (tracks 1, 3, 4, 6, 7 and 8)
Christian Hayes – guitar and vocals
William D. Drake – Television Organ (track 6)

References

Cardiacs albums
1992 albums